Heliconius antiochus, the Antiochus longwing, is a butterfly of the family Nymphalidae. It was described by Carl Linnaeus in 1767. It is found from Panama to the Amazon region. The habitat consists of riparian forests.

Adults have blue-black wings with two transverse white or yellow bands on the distal part of the forewings. They are a Müllerian mimic of Heliconius wallacei, Heliconius sara and Heliconius congener.

The larvae are gregarious and mostly feed on Passiflora species from the subgenus Astrophea. Full-grown larvae have a yellow body with a black head and reach a length of about 12 mm.

Subspecies
Heliconius antiochus antiochus (Venezuela to Peru)
Heliconius antiochus aranea (Fabricius, 1793) (Venezuela)
Heliconius antiochus araneides Staudinger, 1897 (Venezuela)
Heliconius antiochus salvinii Dewitz, 1877 (Venezuela)

References

 Heliconius antiochus in UniProt

antiochus
Butterflies of Central America
Nymphalidae of South America
Lepidoptera of Brazil
Lepidoptera of Colombia
Lepidoptera of French Guiana
Lepidoptera of Venezuela
Fauna of the Amazon
Butterflies described in 1767
Taxa named by Carl Linnaeus